The Kichi Ak-Suu Forest Reserve is located in the Anan'yevo rural community, Issyk-Kul District, Issyk-Kul Region, Kyrgyzstan. Established in 1977, it covers 100 hectares on the south slopes of the Küngöy Ala-Too Range. Its purpose is conservation of natural forests composed of Short-needled Schrenk's spruce (Picea schrenkiana subsp. tianshanica (Rupr.) Bykov.).

References

Issyk-Kul Region
Protected areas established in 1977
Forest reserves of Kyrgyzstan
1970s establishments in the Kirghiz Soviet Socialist Republic